Coffee Republic is a British coffee bar and deli franchise chain founded in 1995.

History 

Coffee Republic was founded in 1995 by brother and sister team Bobby and Sahar Hashemi, opening its first site in London's South Molton Street.

In 1996 Coffee Republic Ltd was founded in Greece by Kostas Dalakouras and partners, and still operates in Horeca market all over Greece, providing gourmet coffee products and services. The company is Coffee Republic S.a. now and owns the national trademark for Greece.

By 1997 Coffee Republic had opened a further 7 stores in London and opened its first stores in Newcastle and Manchester.

The group was listed on AIM in 1998 by reversing into Arion Properties. The group grew to 24 branches after opening 17 new sites between March and November and had expanded to York, Birkenhead, Newcastle and Manchester.

Coffee Republic switched from AIM to the full list in July 2000. At this point, it had 61 coffee bars and cafés and announced plans to open 80 more by 2002.

Bobby Hashemi stepped down as chief executive in March 2001, but continued as a non-executive director; he returned as executive chairman in the summer of 2002.

Coffee Republic bought the GoodBean coffee bar chain in December 2001, thus gaining 12 outlets in south-east England and seven further sites under construction. The acquisition took the group to 108 outlets.

In July 2002, the group announced plans to halt its expansion programme, sell underperforming bars and launch a strategic business review as annual losses grew. A number of takeover talks ensued with easyGroup, Benjys and Caffè Nero but all offers were rejected. Coffee Republic sold 13 sites to Starbucks and returned to an AIM listing.

In August 2003, Coffee Republic unveiled a survival plan to convert itself into a New York-style deli-bar chain called Coffee Republic Deli and whittle its numbers down to a core of 50 outlets. It piloted the concept at Baker Street and Exchange Street in London.

In June 2004 Coffee Republic sold eight outlets in Cardiff and southern England to Caffè Nero.
The group signed its first franchise deal in November 2005 and ended the year with four franchised outlets. It intended to retain just 10 to 15 bars under company ownership.

In October 2006 Founder Bobby Hashemi was ousted in a shareholder revolt and replaced as chairman by Peter Breach.
The company signed a franchise agreement in 2007, with the intent to see the brand launched in Northern Ireland, the Republic of Ireland and also Turkey. In June 2006 its first bar opened in Bulgaria in Burgas, and in July its first bar opened in Turkey in Istanbul.

From 1 May 2008, customers were offered free Wi-Fi across the majority of UK coffee bar estate (10 minutes free then further access subject to purchase). The WiFi is supplied by CommsPort.
Another bar was opened in Malta Airport.

In June 2008 its first bar opened in Romania in Bucharest.

In July 2008 Coffee Republic announced that Steven Bartlett, the former shareholder who ousted the company's founder, had stepped down as chief executive.

In August 2008 the first bar in Kuwait opened.

In December a contactless loyalty card trial was launched with sQuid.

The company's first bar opened in Jeddah, Saudi Arabia in January 2009 but has since closed.

The company was placed into administration in early July 2009 and trading in shares was suspended.  At the end of July, following the closure of 18 bars, Coffee Republic was bought out of administration by property firm Arab Investment Ltd.  The new company trades as Coffee Republic Trading Ltd.

Branches

Concession Partners
Coffee Republic has 99 Concessions operated by 7 partners:
Greene King,
Cineworld,
Ealing Londis,
Travelodge,
Shell,
Enterprise Inns,
London Town Hotels.

See also

 List of coffeehouse chains

References

External links 
 
 Greece

Coffeehouses and cafés in the United Kingdom
1995 establishments in England
Restaurants established in 1995